Steppin' in Society is a 1945 American comedy film directed by Alexander Esway, written by Bradford Ropes, and starring Edward Everett Horton, Gladys George, Ruth Terry, Robert Livingston, Jack La Rue and Lola Lane. It was released on July 9, 1945, by Republic Pictures.

Plot

Cast  
Edward Everett Horton as Judge Avery Webster
Gladys George as Penelope Webster
Ruth Terry as Lola Forrest
Robert Livingston as Montana
Jack La Rue as Bow Tie
Lola Lane as The Duchess
Isabel Jewell as Jenny the Juke
Frank Jenks as George
Paul Hurst as Cookie
Harry Barris as Ivory
Iris Adrian as Shirley
Tom Herbert as Hilliard

References

External links 
 

1945 films
American comedy films
1945 comedy films
Republic Pictures films
Films directed by Alexander Esway
American black-and-white films
1940s English-language films
1940s American films